Playa de Poniente  is a beach in the municipality of La Línea de la Concepción, in the Province of Cádiz, Andalusia, Spain, located to the northwest of Gibraltar.

References

La Línea de la Concepción
Beaches of Andalusia